Axford is an English surname. Notable people with this surname include the following:

 Danny Axford (born 1975), English cyclist
 Ian Axford (1933–2010), New Zealand space scientist
 John Axford (born 1983), Canadian baseball player
 Samuel M. Axford (died 1873), Michigan politician
 Thomas Axford (1894–1983), Sergeant in the Australian army

English-language surnames